The Military ranks of Iraq are the military insignia used by the Iraqi Armed Forces. While the rank structure generally follows the rank structure of the Ottoman Empire, the insignia is inspired by the British insignia.

Commissioned officer ranks
The rank insignia of commissioned officers.

Other ranks
The rank insignia of non-commissioned officers and enlisted personnel.

References

External links
 
 
 

Iraq
Military of Iraq
Iraq